Greatest Hits is the first compilation album by American country music artist Mark Wills. Released in 2002 on Mercury Nashville Records, it features the greatest hits from his first four studio albums: 1996's Mark Wills, 1998's Wish You Were Here, 2000's Permanently, and 2001's Loving Every Minute.

Content
Two new tracks were also recorded for this compilation, both released as singles: "19 Somethin'" and "When You Think of Me". The former became his second number 1 hit on the Billboard Hot Country Singles & Tracks (now Hot Country Songs) charts, holding that position for six weeks; "When You Think of Me" peaked at number 28 on the same chart. Wills produced these two tracks with Chris Lindsey.

The album itself peaked at number 16 on the Billboard Top Country Albums charts and number 140 on The Billboard 200.

Track listing

A: Previously unreleased

Personnel
The following musicians performed on the previously unreleased tracks "19 Somethin'" and "When You Think of Me".
Tim Akers – keyboards
Tom Bukovac – electric guitar on "When You Think of Me"
J. T. Corenflos – electric guitar
Eric Darken – percussion
Aubrey Haynie – fiddle
Wes Hightower – background vocals
Jimmie Lee Sloas – bass guitar
Biff Watson – acoustic guitar
Mark Wills – lead vocals
Lonnie Wilson – drums

Strings on "When You Think of Me" performed by the Nashville String Machine and arranged by Kris Wilkinson.

Tracks 1, 2, and 9 produced by Carson Chamberlain and Keith Stegall; tracks 3-8 produced by Carson Chamberlain; tracks 10 and 11 produced by Chris Lindsey and Mark Wills.

Chart performance

Weekly charts

Year-end charts

References

Allmusic (see infobox)

2002 greatest hits albums
Mark Wills albums
Mercury Records compilation albums